Jessica Anne Fishlock  (born 14 January 1987) is a Welsh professional footballer and coach who plays as a midfielder for OL Reign and the Wales national team. She previously played for Bristol Academy in England's FA Women's Super League (FA WSL), AZ Alkmaar in the Dutch Eredivisie, Glasgow City in the Scottish Women's Premier League, Melbourne Victory and Melbourne City in Australia's W-League, as well as Bundesliga club FFC Frankfurt in Germany.

In February 2017, Fishlock coached Melbourne City to its second consecutive W-League Grand Final title. She previously coached Cardiff City Ladies F.C.

On 5 April 2017, Fishlock became the first Welsh player to earn 100 caps for the national team. She was named Welsh Footballer of the Year in 2011, 2012, 2013, 2014, and 2019. She has won multiple championships and regular season titles with the teams she has played for including the two consecutive Eredivisie championships, two W-League regular season titles, two W-League Grand Final championships, Scottish Women's Premier League and Scottish Women's Cup titles, and two consecutive NWSL Shield wins. Although Fishlock returned to Seattle prior to the 2015 UEFA Women's Champions League Final after playing on loan for FFC Frankfurt, her contributions to the team's journey to the title subsequently earned her a UEFA Women's Champions League medal.

Early life
Fishlock was born in Cardiff, Wales to Kevyn and Sharon Fishlock. She has two brothers and three sisters. As a child, she began playing football with her sister before joining Cardiff City Ladies F.C. at age 7. She later played for Newport Strikers.

Club career

Cardiff City LFC, 2002–2005
Fishlock started her career playing for Cardiff City Ladies F.C. and made her debut for the senior side at age 16. Fishlock made her debut against Reading Royals on 29 September 2002 and scored 19 times in 23 appearances in her first season at the club. Laura McAllister, who was captain of Cardiff City when Fishlock joined the squad said, "Jess joined the junior team but she was so good we fast-tracked her. Jess is just a fabulous player. She is technically superb with fabulous skills and among the 2 or 3% in Britain. She's ambitious and adventurous and to be a top, top sports-player you've got to be like that." At age 16, she was a member of the senior side that won the 2004–05 SW Combination League Championship without losing a point. The team later beat Everton en route to the last eight of the FA Cup and won the Welsh Cup to move on to the UEFA Women's Cup.

As of February 2013, Fishlock remained the club's record goalscorer.

AZ Alkmaar, 2008–2010

In 2008, the Dutch Champions AZ Alkmaar approached Jess to join them and become the first overseas player in the Eredivisie. Jess won back to back league titles during the 2008/2009 and 2009/2010 seasons, and were on track to defend a third title during the 2010/2011 season when she left to come back to the UK.

Bristol Academy WFC, 2011–2012
In 2011, Fishlock joined Bristol in England's FA Women's Super League (FA WSL). During the 2011 season, Bristol achieved a higher-than-expected final league position, and also reached the FA Cup Final where they were defeated by Arsenal 2–0. Fishlock was awarded the 2011 Club Player of the Year, 2011 Fans Player of the Year, and was named to the league's All-Star Team. She was named Welsh Women's Footballer of the Year the same year.

During the 2012 season, Bristol achieved their highest final league position, reached the semi-final of the FA Cup and Continental Cup. Jess was awarded the 2012 Club Players Player of Year, 2012 Fans Player of the Year and 2012 FA WSL Players Player of Year, voted on by managers and players of the FA WSL.

Melbourne Victory, 2012–2014
In November 2012, Fishlock joined W-League side Melbourne Victory for six weeks on a guest player contract helping the team reach their first ever grand final. During the 94th minute of a match against former champions, Canberra United, she scored the game-winning goal boosting Melbourne to the top of the league table. During her six games with Melbourne, she became a favourite with the fans and was also nominated as one of four players for the league-wide Player of the Year Award.

In September 2013, it was announced that Fishlock would return to the Victory for the 2013/14 season on loan from the Seattle Reign FC. During her 11 appearances for the team, she scored three goals and helped lead the team to the Grand Final where the Victory defeated Brisbane Roar 2–0. Fishlock served an assist to Lisa De Vanna in the 38th minute for the game-winning goal. She was named Most Valuable Player of the Match. The win marked the Victory's first Grand Final title in the history of the team.

Reign FC, 2013–present

In February 2013, Fishlock joined NWSL  side, Reign FC for the league's inaugural season. During their second league match against the Portland Thorns FC, Fishlock scored her first goal in front of a record-setting 16,479 fans at Jeld-Wen Field, establishing herself as a powerful force for the Reign. The media named her NWSL Player of the Week for Week 2 of the 2013 season. Fishlock started in all 21 games that she played during the regular season, missing only one game due to Wales national team commitments. She was a leading scorer on the team with four goals and tallied a total of 1,879 minutes.

Fishlock returned to the Reign for the 2014 season. The team set a league record unbeaten streak of 16 games during the first part of the season. During the 16 game stretch, the Reign compiled a  record. The Reign finished first in the regular season clinching the NWSL Shield for the first time. After defeating the Washington Spirit 2–1 in the playoff semi-finals, the Reign were defeated 2–1 by FC Kansas City during the championship final. Following the regular season, Fishlock along with teammates Kendall Fletcher, Kim Little, and Nahomi Kawasumi was named to the league's Best XI team. Fishlock finished the 2014 season, having scored four goals and provided 8 assists. She started in all 22 matches in which she played.

During the 2015 season, Fishlock scored her first goal of the season during the team's home-opener against Western New York Flash. Her goal in the 25th minute was the first of the match and assist to Megan Rapinoe in the 86th minute contributed to a 5–1 win for the Reign. During a match against the Washington Spirit on 2 May, Fishlock scored a goal in the 75th minute off an assist from Kim Little resulting in a 3–1 win over the Spirit. During a match against Sky Blue FC in New Jersey, Fishlock received a controversial red card in the 90th minute that required her to sit out the team's next match against league-leading Chicago Red Stars. The controversy stemmed from a scrum in the box after a Sky Blue corner kick and Fishlock's last-minute save on the goal line. Fishlock stated the ball bounced off her head, but Sky Blue forward Nadia Nadim said she blocked it with her hand and the ref awarded Sky Blue the penalty kick. Both matches resulted in 1–1 draws. During the team's second match against Sky Blue FC in Seattle on 6 June, Fishlock scored a goal and an assist earning Player of the Match after leading Seattle to a 3–0 win. She was named NWSL Player of the Week by the media for the ninth week of the season. The Reign finished the regular season in first place clinching the NWSL Shield for the second consecutive time. After advancing to the playoffs, Seattle faced fourth-place team Washington Spirit and won 3–0, advancing to the championship final. Seattle was ultimately defeated 1–0 by FC Kansas City during the championship final in Portland. Fishlock, along with teammates Kim Little, Beverly Yanez, and Lauren Barnes were named to the NWSL Best XI team.

During the first few months of the 2016 season, Fishlock was unavailable due to injury along with a number of offensive players, including forwards Manon Melis and Megan Rapinoe. Seattle finished the regular season in fifth place with a  record, narrowly missing a playoff spot by two points.

Glasgow City loan

After the conclusion of the NWSL season in August 2013, it was announced that Fishlock would join Scottish Women's Premier League champions Glasgow City on loan until November 2013. Of her signing Glasgow City head coach Eddie Wolecki Black said, "This signing is significant, not only for the club but also the country. Whilst we continue to set new records at home, our aim is to make progress on the European stage and the signing of Jess highlights this. She will bring experience, versatility, pace and intelligence to the team and most importantly will raise the standard of the players around her. That's what top players do, they make good players better players both on and off the park." She scored two goals in her six appearances for the club helping the club finish in first place during the regular season and win the Scottish Women's Cup. She also competed in four matches in the 2013–14 UEFA Women's Champions League with the club reaching the Round of 8.

FFC Frankfurt loan
Fishlock spent the 2014–15 Reign FC off-season on loan in the Frauen-Bundesliga with FFC Frankfurt. She was a vital part of the team's success, starting in all available matches. Frankfurt was unbeaten in the second half of the season, a run which led them to be crowned the champions of Europe. Although Fishlock returned to Seattle prior to the 2015 UEFA Women's Champions League Final, she was considered a huge part of the team's journey to the championship title by players, staff and fans and subsequently earned a UEFA Women's Champions League medal.

Reading loan
On 19 August 2020, it was confirmed that Fishlock had joined Reading Women on loan from OL Reign. The deal was signed as doubts remained about when the NWSL would resume. During a match against Brighton & Hove Albion, she scored two goals lifting Reading to a 3–1 win.

International career
Fishlock made her debut for the U-19 national team at age 16. After captaining the U–19 team, she was called up to the senior national team and made her debut against Switzerland in 2006. She captained the senior team from 2012 to 2015. After a 1–0 win over Mexico during Wales' first match at the 2013 Algarve Cup, Fishlock scored the game-winning goal of the match during the 11th minute. After Wales tied Hungary 1–1 on 11 March 2013, the team faced Portugal in the knockout stage. Fishlock scored Wales only goal in the 77th minute. Portugal scored an equalizing goal in the 93rd-minute leading to penalty kicks to determine the victor. Portugal won after scoring three penalty kicks over Wales' one.

In February 2015, incoming Welsh manager Jayne Ludlow unveiled her squad for the 2015 Istria Cup which did not feature long-time captain Fishlock. Two months later, she was re-called to the team.

On 5 April 2017, Fishlock became the first Welsh player to earn 100 caps for the national team.

International goals

Coaching career
In 2012, Fishlock was the first team coach for her former team, Cardiff City Ladies FC, alongside Manager Jamie Sherwood.

In Melbourne City FC's inaugural season in 2015–16, Fishlock was a player-assistant coach alongside head coach Joe Montemurro. She returned in the same role for the 2016–17 season.

Midway through City's 2016–17 season, head coach Joe Montemurro became the chief assistant coach of Melbourne City men's team, and Fishlock was promoted to player-head coach. In February 2017, she coached Melbourne City to its second consecutive W-League Grand Final title and scored a goal in the 2–0 win over Perth Glory. With the win, she became the first player-coach to win the league title in the W-League's history.

In October 2017, Melbourne City FC announced that Fishlock is returning for the 2017–18 season as a player-assistant coach. She will play under, and coach alongside, now-head coach Patrick Kisnorbo, who assisted Fishlock in the previous season.

Personal life, other work, and endorsements
Fishlock says she knew she was a lesbian at the age of 12, and was bullied at school for her sexuality.

Fishlock has been featured in a column for BBC Sport since 2013. She gave an interview in October 2015, during which she described her struggles as a high-profile gay athlete. Demanding greater "respect", she railed against social media homophobia and threw her weight behind the work of Athlete Ally.

Fishlock appeared in an advertisement for Adidas in 2016 along with Becky Sauerbrunn. She had an endorsement deal with natural sports beverage company, Golazo, Inc. prior to the company folding.

In the 2018 Birthday Honours, Fishlock was appointed a Member of the Order of the British Empire (MBE) "for services to women's football and the LGBT community." Fishlock officially received her MBE from The Prince of Wales in a ceremony at Buckingham Palace in December 2018. In December 2020, she was named to the Stonewall Sports Champion Team.

, she is engaged to Tziarra King.

Honours

Player 
AZ Alkmaar
Eredivisie: 2008–09, 2009–10

Bristol Academy
FA Cup runner-up: 2010–11

Melbourne Victory
W-League Championship: 2013–14; runner-up: 2012–13
W-League Premiership: 2013–14OL Reign NWSL Shield: 2014, 2015, 2022
NWSL Championship runner-up: 2014, 2015
 The Women's Cup: 2022FFC FrankfurtUEFA Champions League: 2014–15Melbourne CityW-League Championship: 2015–16, 2016–17, 2017–18
W-League Premiership: 2015–16LyonDivision 1 Féminine: 2018–19
Coupe de France: 2018–19
UEFA Champions League: 2018–19IndividualFA WSL Club Player of the Year: 2011
FA WSL Fans Player of the Year: 2011, 2012
FA WSL Club Players' Player of the Year: 2012
FA WSL Players' Player of the Year: 2012
NWSL Most Valuable Player: 2021
NWSL Best XI: 2013, 2014, 2015, 2017, 2021
NWSL Second XI: 2016
NWSL Team of the Month: 2x 2017
NWSL Player of the Week: 2013, 2015, 2x 2017)
W-League Best XI: 2012
W-League Grand Final: Player of the Match: 2013 & 2017
W-League League Players Player of the Year: 2013 
W-League Club Players Player of the Year: 2013
Welsh Footballer of the Year: 2011, 2012, 2013, 2014, 2018

 Manager Melbourne City' W-League Championship: 2016–17

See also

 List of footballers with 100 or more caps
 List of Melbourne Victory FC (A-League Women) players
 List of foreign W-League (Australia) players
 W-League records and statistics
 List of foreign NWSL players
 List of sportswomen

References

Further reading
 Fan Hong, J. A. Mangan (2004), Soccer, Women, Sexual Liberation: Kicking Off a New Era, Taylor & Francis, 
 Grainey, Timothy (2012), Beyond Bend It Like Beckham: The Global Phenomenon of Women's Soccer, University of Nebraska Press, 
 Stead, Phil (2013), Red Dragons: The Story of Welsh Football, Y Lolfa, 
 Stewart, Barbara (2012), Women's Soccer: The Passionate Game'', D&M Publishers Incorporated,

External links

 
 Wales player profile (archived)
 
 Seattle Reign video profile
 
 

1987 births
Footballers from Cardiff
Living people
Welsh women's footballers
Wales women's international footballers
Cardiff City Ladies F.C. players
Bristol Academy W.F.C. players
AZ Alkmaar (women) players
Melbourne Victory FC (A-League Women) players
OL Reign players
Glasgow City F.C. players
1. FFC Frankfurt players
Melbourne City FC (A-League Women) players
FA Women's National League players
Women's Super League players
Eredivisie (women) players
A-League Women players
National Women's Soccer League players
Expatriate women's footballers in the Netherlands
British LGBT footballers
Welsh LGBT sportspeople
Lesbian sportswomen
Welsh Premier Women's Football League players
Welsh expatriate sportspeople in Germany
Welsh expatriate sportspeople in Australia
Expatriate women's footballers in Germany
Expatriate women's soccer players in Australia
FIFA Century Club
Women's association football midfielders
Olympique Lyonnais Féminin players
Division 1 Féminine players
Frauen-Bundesliga players
Association football player-managers
Members of the Order of the British Empire
Welsh expatriate sportspeople in France
Expatriate women's footballers in France
Welsh expatriate sportspeople in the United States
Expatriate women's soccer players in the United States
Association footballers' wives and girlfriends